Rana Maqbool Ahmad is a Pakistani politician who has been a Member of the Senate of Pakistan, since March 2018.

Political career
He was nominated by Pakistan Muslim League (N) (PML-N) as its candidate in 2018 Pakistani Senate election. However the Election Commission of Pakistan declared all PML-N candidates for the Senate election as independent after a ruling of the Supreme Court of Pakistan.

Ahmad was elected to the Senate of Pakistan as an independent candidate on general seat from Punjab in Senate election. He was backed in the election by PML-N and joined the treasury benches, led by PML-N after getting elected. He took oath as Senator on 12 March 2018.

References

Living people
Pakistan Muslim League (N) politicians
Members of the Senate of Pakistan
Year of birth missing (living people)